Hard Rock Casino Vancouver (formerly Boulevard Casino) in Coquitlam, British Columbia is the largest casino in the province of British Columbia by gaming space. The casino is open 24 hours a day, is owned by Great Canadian Gaming.

According to their 2006-07 annual report, Boulevard Casino was the third most profitable gaming venue in B.C., bringing in more than $158 million for the year (up to $28.9 million over the previous year). The increase is attributed to the new show theatre, where the casino sees up to 5,000 guests on show nights.

The funding agreement with the province means the casino must give 10% of its net take to the city of Coquitlam. In 2010 Coquitlam received $8.2 million, which the city put into a community group fund and into major capital projects, such as the new Chimo Aquatic and Fitness Centre in 2008, the Percy Perry Stadium renovation in 2009, the Coquitlam Sports Centre renovation in 2010, and the new City Centre Public Library in 2011.

The casino re-branded itself as Hard Rock Casino Vancouver on December 20, 2013, after an agreement with the Seminole Tribe of Florida which owns the Hard Rock Cafe, Inc. and is the legal the franchisor and owner of the Hard Rock brand.

Amenities
As part of the 2006 expansion, the new 1,074-seat The Molson Canadian Theatre was opened on-site.

See also
 List of casinos in Canada

References

External links
 Official webpage
 Birds-Eye view of Boulevard Casino from Live Search Maps

 Buildings and structures in Coquitlam
 Casinos in British Columbia
 Tourism in British Columbia
 Hard Rock Cafe
 2001 establishments in British Columbia